Bonares is a town and municipality located in the province of Huelva, Spain. According to the 2013 census, the city has a population of 6,282 inhabitants.

Demographics

References

External links
Bonares - Sistema de Información Multiterritorial de Andalucía

Municipalities in the Province of Huelva